Maltese Italian is the Italian language spoken in Malta. It has received some influences from the Maltese language.

History

For many centuries since the Middle Ages and until 1934, Italian was the official language of Malta. Indeed, it had been considered the language of culture in Malta since the Italian Renaissance. 

In the 19th century, Italian irredentists and Italian Maltese wanted to promote its use throughout Malta for plans to re-unify it with Italy as Malta was part of the Kingdom of Sicily up to the 13th century. In the first decades of the 20th century there was even a struggle within Maltese society and politics over the "language problem", which came to a head before World War II. 

Although only the rich could speak Italian, it was however understood by nearly all the population, and with Maltese being generally spoken by those less well-off, Italian was used as the official language in Malta until 1934.

But in 1933, the Constitution was withdrawn over the Government's budgetary vote for the teaching of Italian in elementary schools. and furthermore Italian was dropped by the British authorities from official language status in Malta in 1934, its place being taken by Maltese.

In 1935, there were protests against all these decisions, promoted by the Maltese nationalists: the Nationalist Party of Enrico Mizzi declared that most of the Maltese population was supporting directly or indirectly the Italian Maltese's struggle. 

One of the staunchest supporters of the Italian language in Malta was Carmelo Borg Pisani.

The greatest Italian-speaking Maltese of the second half of the 20th century is Vincenzo Maria Pellegrini (1911–1997), who wrote most of his works in Italian and composed a poem in Maltese Italian in honor of Garibaldi in 1982, a hundred years after the death of the "hero of the two worlds".

Since the 1950s, there has been a huge increase in Maltese people who are able to speak or understand (or both) the Italian language, thanks mainly to broadcasts of Italian television: from 15% (nearly 40,000) in 1950 to 36% (145,000) in 2002 and to 86% (360,000) in 2010.

Furthermore, since 1970, Maltese Italian has been considered for possible reinstatement as an official language in Malta. In 1981, the government of Malta began to publish the monthly magazine Lo Stivale in Maltese Italian. The Malta Constitution allows 3 languages to be official in Malta and this rule is favorable to the reinstatement of the Italian language.

See also
 Italian language in Croatia

Notes

Bibliography
 Brincat, Giuseppe. Malta. Una storia linguistica. Ed. Le Mani. Recco, 2004
 Brincat, J. La lingua italiana a Malta: storia, scuola e società. Istituto italiano di cultura. Valletta, 1992
 Caruana, S. The Italian Job: the impact of input from television on language learning (in J. Borg, M. A. Lauri, & A. Hillman (eds.), Exploring the Maltese Media Landscape). Allied Newspapers Ltd. Valletta, 2009 
 Fabei, Stefano. Carmelo Borg Pisani (1915–1942) – eroe o traditore?. Lo Scarabeo Ed. Bologna, 2006
 Hull, Geoffrey. The Malta Language Question: A Case Study in Cultural Imperialism. Said International, Valletta, 1993.

External links
 Sandro Caruana & Mario Pace Percorsi dell’italiano a Malta: storia, intrattenimento, scuola. Malta University
 Development of languages in Middle Ages Malta (in Italian)

Languages of Malta
Geographical distribution of the Italian language